...Where Would I Be?  is an album by guitarist Jim Hall which was recorded in 1971 and first released on the Milestone label.

Reception

AllMusic awarded the album 3 stars and its review by Scott Yanow states "Although the rhythm section was more "modern" than he usually used (keyboardist Benny Aronov, bassist Malcolm Cecil, and Airto Moreira on drums and percussion), guitarist Jim Hall (who always had a harmonically advanced style anyway) has little difficulty adapting to the fresh setting".

Track listing
All compositions by Jim Hall except where noted.

 "Simple Samba" - 4:18
 "Where Would I Be?" (Jane Herbert) - 5:11
 "Careful" - 4:54
 "Baubles, Bangles, & Beads" (Robert Wright, George Forrest) - 3:26
 "Minotaur" - 8:08
 "I Should Care" (Axel Stordahl, Paul Weston, Sammy Cahn) - 3:50
 "Vera Cruz" (Milton Nascimento) - 3:55
 "Goodbye, My Love" (Herbert) - 5:37

Personnel 
Jim Hall - guitar
Benny Aronov - piano, electric piano (tracks 1-5, 7 & 8)
Malcolm Cecil - bass (tracks 1-5, 7 & 8)
Airto Moreira - drums, percussion (tracks 1-5, 7 & 8)

References 

1972 albums
Jim Hall (musician) albums
Milestone Records albums